Denys Molchanov and Igor Zelenay were the defending champions but chose not to defend their title.

Ruben Bemelmans and Tim Pütz won the title after defeating Facundo Argüello and Guillermo Durán 6–3, 6–1 in the final.

Seeds

Draw

References

External links
 Main draw

Tunis Open - Doubles
2019 Doubles